This is a list of castles and chateaux located in the Vysočina Region of the Czech Republic.

A
 Aleje Chateau
 Aueršperk Castle

B
 Bačkov Chateau
 Batelov Chateau
 Bobrová Castle
 Brtnice Chateau
 Březina Chateau
 Budeč Castle
 Budišov Chateau
 Bukov Castle

C
 Chotěboř Chateau
 Chřenovice Castle
 Čalonice Castle
 Černá Chateau
 Černovice Chateau
 Červená Řečice Chateau
 Čížkov Chateau

D
 Dalečín Castle
 Dalečín Chateau
 Dolní Heřmanice Castle
 Dolní Krupá Chateau
 Dolní Rožínka Chateau
 Dub Castle
 Dukovany Chateau

G
 Golčův Jeníkov - nový zámek Chateau
 Golčův Jeníkov - starý zámek Chateau

H
 Holoubek Castle
 Horní Cerekev Chateau
 Hořepník Chateau
 Hostačov Chateau
 Hrádek u Podmok Castle

J
 Jamné Chateau
 Janštejn Castle
 Jaroměřice nad Rokytnou Chateau
 Jemnice Chateau
 Jimramov Chateau

K
 Kamenice nad Lipou Chateau
 Kámen Castle
 Klokočov Chateau
 Kněžice Chateau
 Kokštejn Castle
 Kostelec Castle
 Košetice - nový zámek Chateau
 Košetice - starý zámek Chateau
 Košíkov Castle
 Kozlov (Hradisko) - dolní sídlo Castle
 Kozlov (Hradisko) - horní sídlo Castle
 Kozlov Castle
 Krasonice Chateau
 Kraví Hora Castle
 Krumvald Castle
 Křižanov Chateau

L

 Lacembok Castle
 Lamberk Castle
 Ledeč nad Sázavou Castle
 Ledeč nad Sázavou Chateau
 Lesonice Chateau
 Libice nad Doubravou Chateau
 Lipnice nad Sázavou Castle
 Litohoř Chateau
 Loučky Castle
 Luka nad Jihlavou Chateau

M
 Maleč Chateau
 Mitrov Castle
 Mitrov Chateau
 Moravec Chateau
 Moravské Budějovice Chateau
 Mostiště Castle
 Mstěnice - hrad Castle

N
 Náměšť nad Oslavou Chateau
 Nová Ves u Chotěboře Chateau
 Nové Město na Moravě Chateau
 Nové Syrovice Chateau
 Nový Hrad Castle
 Nový Rychnov Chateau
 Nový Studenec Chateau

O
 Okříšky Chateau
 Onšov Chateau
 Orlík u Humpolce Castle
 Osová Chateau

P
 Pacov Chateau
 Pechburg Castle
 Pelhřimov Chateau
 Pernštejn Castle
 Police Castle
 Polná Chateau
 Proseč - Obořiště Chateau
 Proseč u Pošné Chateau
 Přibyslav Chateau
 Pyšolec Castle

R
 Rabštejn Castle
 Radešín Chateau
 Rokštejn Castle
 Ronov Castle
 Ronovec Castle
 Roštejn Castle
 Rozsochatec Chateau
 Rožná Castle
 Rudolec Chateau
 Rysov Castle

S
  Chateau
 Skály (u Jimramova) Castle
 Sokolov Castle
 Stránecká Zhoř Chateau
 Střeliště Castle
 Světlá nad Sázavou Chateau
 Šternberk Castle
  Chateau
 Štoky Chateau

T
 Telč Chateau
 Třebíč Chateau
 Třešť Chateau

U
 Úhrov Chateau
 Újezd u Tišnova Castle

V
 Velké Meziříčí Chateau
 Větrný Jeníkov Chateau
 Vilémov Chateau
 Vilémovice Chateau
 Víckov Castle

Z

  Castle (cs)
 Zboží Chateau
 Zkamenělý zámek Castle
 Zubštejn Castle
 Žďár nad Sázavou Chateau
 Žďárec Castle
 Zňátky Castle
 Žirovnice Chateau

See also
 List of castles in the Czech Republic
 List of castles in Europe
 List of castles

External links 
 Castles, Chateaux, and Ruins 
 Czech Republic - Manors, Castles, Historical Towns
 Hrady.cz 

Castles in the Vysočina Region
Vysocina